Ya-da-villi village is located in West Godavari district of Andhra Pradesh.

Villages in West Godavari district